The 2019 Czech Indoor Athletics Championships was the 27th edition of the national indoor track and field championships for the Czech Republic. It was held on 16 and 17 February at the Ostravar Aréna in Ostrava, the same venue as the annual Czech Indoor Gala.

The combined track and field events were held from 8–10 February in Prague.

Results

Men

Women

References

Results
 Výsledky Mistrovství ČR mužů a žen. atletika.cz. Retrieved 2019-07-24.
 Výsledky Mistrovství ČR mužů, žen, juniorů, juniorek, dorostenců, dorostenek, žáků a žákyň ve vícebojích. atletika.cz. Retrieved 2019-07-24.

External links
 Czech Athletics Federation website

Czech Indoor Athletics Championships
Czech Athletics Championships
Czech Athletics Championships
Czech Athletics Championships
Sport in Ostrava